is a Japanese H game brand used by F&C. It is best known for its Welcome to Pia Carrot series.

Cocktail Soft temporarily shut down in 2001 after an organizational restructuring of F&C, but resumed business in 2004, releasing Tenkuu no Symphonia in November that year.

Main works
Welcome to Pia Carrot series
Can Can Bunny series
With You
Canvas—A Motif Sepia Coloured
Univ series

External links
F&C Official homepage

1989 establishments in Japan
Video game publishing brands